John Leonard Davis (born May 14, 1973) is a former American football tight end in the National Football League for the Tampa Bay Buccaneers, Minnesota Vikings, and Chicago Bears. He also was a member of the Amsterdam Admirals in the World League of American Football. He played college football at Emporia State University.

Early years
Davis attended Jasper High School, where he practiced football, basketball and track. He contributed in setting a national high school record with a time of 39.9 seconds in the 4 × 100 metres relay.

He moved on to Cisco Junior College after graduation. In 1992, he transferred to Emporia State University. As a senior, he started at tight end and was moved to running back for the final 6 games of the season, registering 128 carries for 624 yards (4.9-yard average), 7 rushing touchdowns, 13 receptions for 172 yards (13.2-yard average ) and 2 receiving touchdowns.

Professional career

Dallas Cowboys
Davis was selected by the Dallas Cowboys in the fifth round (2nd overall) of the 1994 Supplemental Draft. He was waived on August 28. On August 30, he was signed to the practice squad. On August 22, 1995, he was released after being passed on the depth chart by rookies Eric Bjornson and Kendell Watkins.

New Orleans Saints
On June 3, 1996, he was signed by the New Orleans Saints. He was cut on August 12.

Tampa Bay Buccaneers
On January 20, 1997, he was signed by the Tampa Bay Buccaneers and allocated to the Amsterdam Admirals of the World League of American Football, where he collected 18 receptions for 217 yards and one touchdown as the starter at tight end. In the NFL regular season, he appeared in 8 games (2 starts). 

In the next 2 seasons, he was the third-string tight end behind Dave Moore and Patrick Hape. In 1999, he contributed to a 14-13 playoff victory over the Washington Redskins, catching the winning touchdown with 7:29 minutes left.

Minnesota Vikings
On June 1, 2000, he signed as a free agent with the Minnesota Vikings. He appeared in 15 games (9 starts), tallying 17 receptions for 202 yards and one touchdown. In July 2001, he suffered lacerations to his face in a car accident. On July 29, he was placed on the non-football-related injury active list. On August 9, his contract was terminated after he failed a physical.

Chicago Bears
On August 14, 2001, he was signed by the Chicago Bears, to provide depth after tight end  Kaseem Sinceno was lost for the season with a fractured left ankle. He appeared in 16 games (7 starts), making 11 receptions for 68 yards and no touchdowns

In 2002, he appeared in 10 contests and started 8 games over Fred Baxter. He posted a career-high 20 receptions for 193 yards and 3 touchdowns, despite missing the final 5 contests after injuring his back against the Detroit Lions.

On August 12, 2003, he had surgery to remove a disc from his back. On August 24, he was placed on the physically-unable-to-perform list. On October 22, he was released after failing the team's physical with back and knee injuries.

References

External links
Tampa Bay Buccaneers bio

1973 births
Living people
People from Jasper, Texas
Players of American football from Texas
American football tight ends
Cisco Wranglers football players
Emporia State Hornets football players
Dallas Cowboys players
Amsterdam Admirals players
Tampa Bay Buccaneers players
Minnesota Vikings players
Chicago Bears players